Gregory Allen Ritchie (born January 25, 1964) is an American baseball player and coach. He is the head coach of the George Washington Colonials baseball team. He played for the Brother Elephants in the Chinese Professional Baseball League in 1995 and coached the Pittsburgh Pirates of Major League Baseball in 2013.

Playing career
The San Francisco Giants selected Ritchie in the eighth round, with the 188th overall pick, of the 1986 Major League Baseball Draft. He played in the Giants' minor league system from 1986 to 1992, reaching Triple-A. In 1995, he played in the Texas Rangers organization.

Coaching career
In 1996, Ritchie became a hitting coach in the Chicago White Sox minor league system, working for the Bristol White Sox of the Appalachian League in 1996 and 1997, the Winston-Salem Warthogs of the Carolina League in 1999, the Burlington Bees of the Midwest League in 2000, the Birmingham Barons of the Southern League from 2000–2003, and the Charlotte Knights of the International League from 2003 through 2005.  In 2006, Ritchie joined the Pittsburgh Pirates organization as their roving minor league hitting coordinator.

Ritchie was named the hitting coach for the Pittsburgh Pirates for the 2011 season. He was also their hitting coach for the 2012 season. On October 11, 2012, he was announced as the head baseball coach for George Washington.  In his first season, he was named the 2013 A-10 Coach of the Year.

Head coaching record
Below is a table of Ritchie's yearly records as an NCAA head baseball coach.

References

External links

Chinese Professional Baseball League

1964 births
American expatriate baseball players in Taiwan
Clinton Giants players
Everett Giants players
George Washington Colonials baseball coaches
George Washington Colonials baseball players
Living people
Oklahoma City 89ers players
Phoenix Firebirds players
Pittsburgh Pirates coaches
San Jose Giants players
Shreveport Captains players
American expatriate baseball players in Mexico
Industriales de Monterrey players
Olmecas de Tabasco players